is a Japanese football player for Ehime FC.

Career statistics
Updated to 6 January 2018.

1Includes Emperor's Cup.

2Includes J. League Cup.

3Includes AFC Champions League.

References

External links

Profile at JEF United Chiba

1992 births
Living people
Association football people from Chiba Prefecture
Japanese footballers
J1 League players
J2 League players
Nagoya Grampus players
Matsumoto Yamaga FC players
Mito HollyHock players
JEF United Chiba players
FC Machida Zelvia players
Ehime FC players
Association football forwards